The Youth Congress on Information Technology (formerly known as the Philippine Youth Congress on Information Technology and commonly known as Y4iT) is an annual information technology event in the Philippines organized by the UP System Information Technology Foundation (UP SITF). Established in 2003, Y4iT primarily targets college students, professionals, educators, IT experts and enthusiasts interested in discussions/networking opportunities, latest IT innovations, exploring how to be competitive in the digital market, and more. Y4iT has inspired thousands of students and educators alike from across the country, encouraging awareness and networking with like-minded IT professionals. Since its inception, Y4iT has gradually grown to become the leading IT congress in the Philippines.

History
Y4iT's precursor, the 2003 National IT Student Congress held on September 2 and 3 at the University Theater in UP Diliman, Quezon City, attracted at least 5,000 participants from all over the nation. Attendance has been steadily increasing, benefiting from an increasing number of lectures.

1st Youth Congress on Information Technology Cebu
Dubbed "Y4iT Cebu", UP SITF held Y4iT outside of Luzon for the first time on November 22 & 23, 2012 at the Trade Hall of SM City Cebu.

See also
 UP Department of Computer Science
 Philippine Society of Information Technology Educators
 University of the Philippines Information Technology Training Center

References

External links
 Y4iT iskWiki! entry
 Y4iT Website
 Y4iT Facebook
 Y4iT Twitter

Technology conferences
UP Diliman College of Engineering
Articles containing video clips
Recurring events established in 2003
2003 establishments in the Philippines
Annual events in the Philippines